In Greek mythology, the name Branchus refers to the following characters, who may or may not be identical:
 Branchus  a lover of Apollo and a prophet. 
 Branchus, father of Cercyon, by the nymph Argiope.

References 

Characters in Greek mythology